Dombrád is a town in Szabolcs-Szatmár-Bereg county, in the Northern Great Plain region of eastern Hungary.

Etymology
The name comes from a Slavic personal name, compare with Czech Domorád, Domorod or Serbo-Croatian Domorad.

Geography
www.dombrad.hu

Sports
The town has become famous on the internet as the home  of two of the most famous Football Freestylers in the world Sűrü Fx Tamás and Roland Rocco Karászi. Many Freestylers are stunned at the extreme level of the two legends from this obscure Hungarian village. Palle  famously said "there is something amazing in the water of Dombrad, and I should like to drink it". The streets of Dombrad have been viewed by millions on the web due to these outstanding players. Many have said that "Fx is the king".

References

Populated places in Szabolcs-Szatmár-Bereg County